The Ahmanson Theatre is one of the four main venues that compose the Los Angeles Music Center.

History
The theatre was built as a result of a donation from Howard F. Ahmanson Sr, the founder of H.F. Ahmanson & Co., an insurance and savings and loans company. It was named for his second wife, businesswoman and philanthropist Caroline Leonetti Ahmanson.

Welton Becket & Associates was the architect. Construction began on March 9, 1962 and was undertaken by Peter Kiewit & Sons (now Kiewit Corporation). The theatre's inaugural event was held on April 12, 1967, with the Los Angeles Civic Light Opera Association sponsoring the national cast production of Man of La Mancha, starring Richard Kiley and Joan Diener. The theatre also was the U.S. premiere of More Stately Mansions starring Ingrid Bergman, Arthur Hill, and Colleen Dewhurst, which opened September 12 of that same year. Since then, it has presented a wide variety of dramas, musicals, comedies and revivals of the classics, including six world premieres of Neil Simon plays and works by Wendy Wasserstein, August Wilson, A.R. Gurney, Terrence McNally, John Guare and Edward Albee. The Ahmanson also has served in the capacity of co-producer for a number of Broadway productions, including Amadeus, Smokey Joe's Cafe, The Most Happy Fella, and The Drowsy Chaperone.

The theater was also home to the Los Angeles production of The Phantom of the Opera which ran at the theater from 1989 to 1993. It opened with the original London and Broadway Phantom Michael Crawford as the Phantom. He was later replaced with actor Robert Guillaume, and then Davis Gaines.

The Ahmanson has the largest theatrical season-ticket subscription base on the West Coast. Its year-round season begins in early fall and lasts through late summer.

1990s renovation
Throughout 1994, a major $17 million renovation moved the mezzanine and balcony closer to the stage, reduced the width of the auditorium, lowered the ceiling and significantly improved the acoustics, which had long been criticized since the theater's opening. It also allowed the theatre's seating capacity to be reconfigured from 1,600 seats for an intimate play to 2,084 for a major Broadway-sized musical.

Designed by Ellerbe Becket Architects and constructed by Robert F. Mahoney & Associates, the renovation took eighteen months to complete. During this time, the Ahmanson's season-ticket subscriptions were presented at the UCLA James A. Doolittle Theatre (now known as Ricardo Montalbán Theatre) in Hollywood. The Ahmanson reopened on January 25, 1995, with an -month-long run of Miss Saigon.

World premieres
The Ahmanson served as the world premiere venue for the following plays and musicals:
 The Happy Time (1967) – Book by N. Richard Nash, Music by John Kander Lyrics by Fred Ebb, Directed by Gower Champion
 Catch My Soul (1968) – Book by N. Richard Nash, Music by Ray Pohlman Lyrics by William Shakespeare
 Love Match (1968) – Book by Christian Hamilton, Music by David Shire Lyrics by Richard Maltby Jr.
 Remote Asylum (1970) – written by Mart Crowley, starring William Shatner
 California Suite (1976) – written by Neil Simon
 Chapter Two (1977) – written by Neil Simon
 They're Playing Our Song (1978) – Book by Neil Simon, Music by Marvin Hamlisch, Lyrics by Carole Bayer Sager
 The West Side Waltz (1981) – written by Ernest Thompson, starring Katharine Hepburn and Dorothy Loudon
 Brighton Beach Memoirs (1982) – written by Neil Simon, starring Matthew Broderick
 A Sense of Humor (1983) – written by Ernest Thompson, starring Jack Lemmon, Estelle Parsons and Polly Holliday
 Biloxi Blues (1984) – written by Neil Simon, starring Matthew Broderick
 Legends! (1986) – written by James Kirkwood, starring Mary Martin and Carol Channing
 Proposals (1997) – directed by Joe Mantello
 Curtains (2006) – Book by Rupert Holmes, Music by John Kander Lyrics by Fred Ebb, Directed by Scott Ellis
 9 to 5 (2008) - Book by Patricia Resnick, Music and Lyrics by Dolly Parton, Directed by Joe Mantello
 Minsky's (2009) – Book by Bob Martin, Music by Charles Strouse and Lyrics by Susan Birkenhead

Awards and nominations

References

External links
 

Theatres in Los Angeles
Buildings and structures in Downtown Los Angeles
Bunker Hill, Los Angeles
Civic Center, Los Angeles
Theatres completed in 1967
1960s architecture in the United States
Welton Becket buildings